Stefan Krauss (born 25 June 1967) is a German former alpine skier.

World Cup results
Top 10

References

External links
 

1967 births
Living people
German male alpine skiers
Sportspeople from Upper Bavaria
People from Berchtesgaden